A mitosome is an organelle found in some unicellular eukaryotic organisms, like in members of the supergroup Excavata. The mitosome was found and named in 1999, and its function has not yet been well characterized. It was termed a crypton by one group, but that name is no longer in use.

The mitosome has been detected only in anaerobic or microaerophilic organisms that do not have mitochondria. These organisms do not have the capability of gaining energy from oxidative phosphorylation, which is normally performed by mitochondria. The mitosome was first described in Entamoeba histolytica, an intestinal parasite of humans. Mitosomes have also been identified in several species of Microsporidia and in Giardia intestinalis.

Origin and function
Mitosomes are almost certainly derived from mitochondria. Like mitochondria, they have a double membrane and most proteins are delivered to them by a targeting sequence of amino acids. The targeting sequence is similar to that used for mitochondria and true mitochondrial presequences will deliver proteins to mitosomes. A number of proteins associated with mitosomes have been shown to be closely related to those of mitochondria or hydrogenosomes (which are also degenerate mitochondria).

Current knowledge indicates mitosomes probably play a role in Fe-S cluster assembly, since they do not display any of the proteins involved in other major mitochondrial functions (aerobic respiration, haem biosynthesis) and they do display proteins required for Fe-S cluster biosynthesis (like frataxin, cysteine desulfurase, Isu1 and a mitochondrial Hsp70).

Unlike mitochondria, mitosomes do not have genes within them. The genes for mitosomal components are contained in the nuclear genome. An early report suggested the presence of DNA in this organelle, but more recent research has shown this not to be the case.

References 

Organelles